Nicolás Hernan Chiesa (born 26 May 1980) is an Argentine former footballer who played as a forward and a manager.

Coaching career
On 5 December 2017, Chiesa was appointed manager of Maltese club Floriana. He was fired on 27 August 2018.

At the end of December 2018 it was confirmed, that Chiesa had been hired at Boca Juniors, where he was to deal with scouting and monitoring possible reinforcements in the different leagues. He left his position at the end of 2019.

In 2020, Chiesa joined the coaching staff of the Ecuador national team under manager Gustavo Alfaro, with his main task being to scout and analyze the Ecuadorian players featuring in Europe.

Honours

Player
Almirante Brown
Primera B: 2006–07
Floriana
Maltese FA Trophy: 2016–17

Manager
Floriana
Maltese Super Cup: 2017

References

External links
 Interview with Nicolas Chiesa

1980 births
Living people
Argentine footballers
Association football forwards
Nueva Chicago footballers
Club Almirante Brown footballers
Cañuelas footballers
FC Politehnica Iași (1945) players
Pisa S.C. players
A.S.D. Martina Calcio 1947 players
Floriana F.C. players
Liga I players
Serie D players
Primera B Metropolitana players
Primera Nacional players
Primera C Metropolitana players
Maltese Premier League players
Argentine expatriate footballers
Expatriate footballers in Romania
Argentine expatriate sportspeople in Romania
Expatriate footballers in Italy
Argentine expatriate sportspeople in Italy
Expatriate footballers in Malta
Argentine expatriate sportspeople in Malta
Argentine football managers
Argentine expatriate football managers
Expatriate football managers in Malta
Floriana F.C. managers
Footballers from Buenos Aires